Manuel Delgado may refer to:

Manuel Delgado (born 1955) Spanish water polo player
Manuel Delgado Barreto (1879–1936), Spanish journalist
Manuel Delgado Parker (1936–2019), Peruvian entrepreneur who founded the media conglomerate Grupo RPP
Manuel Delgado Ruiz (born 1956), Catalan anthropologist
Manuel Delgado Villegas (1943–1998), Spanish serial killer 
Manuel Ruben Delgado (born 1940), Chicano activist and leader of the Third World Liberation Front strikes of 1968